Betrayal at House on the Hill is a board game published by Avalon Hill in 2004, designed by Bruce Glassco and developed by Rob Daviau, Bill McQuillan, Mike Selinker, and Teeuwynn Woodruff. Players all begin as allies exploring a haunted house filled with dangers, traps, items, and omens. As players journey to new parts of the mansion, room tiles are chosen at random and placed on the game board; this means that the game is different each session.  Eventually the "haunt" begins, with the nature and plot of this session's ghost story revealed; one player usually "betrays" the others and takes the side of the ghosts, monsters, or other enemies, while the remaining players collaborate to defeat them.

Gameplay

Betrayal consists of two phases, the initial Exploration phase and the Haunt phase. At the start of the game, each player selects a character and sets the meters at the starting values. The "house" starts with a ground, upper, and basement floors; the ground and upper floors are immediately connected by a staircase, whereas the basement remains unconnected until certain room tiles, event cards or other actions allow a connection. On each turn, the player can move through a number of rooms equivalent to their current Speed. If the player moves through a door where no room has been placed, they add a new room to the house. If that room has an Event, Item, or Omen icon, the player draws the respective card and follows its instructions. Event cards often require the player to make a roll against one of their skills to avoid damage or gain benefits.

After drawing an Omen card, the player must roll six dice, and if this roll is lower than the number of Omen cards that have been drawn, the Haunt phase starts. Tables in the game's rulebooks are used to determine which Haunt is used based on what room and Omen triggered the Haunt, and who the "traitor" is; though often the traitor is the one who triggered the Haunt, it may be another player. At this point, the player who is the traitor leaves the room; they read through their specific Haunt goals and rules from one book, while the other players read their victory rules and conditions from a second book and discuss plans to deal with the traitor. Haunts are based on numerous horror tropes, such as zombies, cannibals, dragons, vampires, ghosts, etc. The exact goals for both the other players and the traitor differ for each possible Haunt; neither side is forced to reveal any new abilities or victory goals, but they must explicitly state what moves they are doing in the game to the other players. After the traitor rejoins the players, players may can attack the traitor or any other creatures they might control, and vice versa. 

The game features 50 possible haunts.

Versions
Extensive errata, to address unclear or indeterminate rules, are freely available. The first edition is no longer in print, and the second edition was released on October 5, 2010. A Dungeons & Dragons themed version of the game, entitled Betrayal at Baldur's Gate, was announced on June 3, 2017, and released on October 6, 2017.

On November 17, 2017, a "legacy" version of the game, titled Betrayal Legacy, was announced for a Q4 2018 release, featuring a prologue and a thirteen-chapter story taking place over multiple decades. It was released on November 9, 2018.

Avalon Hill released "Betrayal at Mystery Mansion", a Scooby-Doo themed version of the game, on July 24, 2020. This variant includes 25 haunts based on episodes from the show, features faster playtimes than previous versions at 25-50 minutes, and has five playable characters: Scooby-Doo, Fred Jones, Daphne Blake, Velma Dinkley, and Norville "Shaggy" Rogers. Another notable change from previous entries in the Betrayal series is that players may volunteer to be the traitor instead of leaving it up to chance.

On March 1, 2022, Avalon Hill announced a third edition of Betrayal at House on the Hill, releasing April 1, 2022 in Europe before being released to the rest of the world on August 1, 2022. This updated version streamlines gameplay, updates the core haunt mechanics, and adds 5 new scenarios, which give a starting reason for a player's involvement and can modify the Haunt. Third edition also updates the graphical assets and comes with six unpainted miniatures for players to paint. Expansions on this edition are expected to be seen "down the line" according to Chris Nadeau, a senior director and product development lead at Avalon Hill.

Expansions
On April 20, 2016, it was announced that Betrayal at House on the Hill would receive its first expansion, entitled Widow's Walk, on October 14, 2016.  The expansion added 20 new room tiles, creating an additional floor (the roof) for gameplay, plus 30 new cards and 50 new haunts. The expansion was designed by Mike Selinker, who was a developer on the original game, as well as Elisa Teague and Liz Spain. Several notable figures contributed to the expansion, animator and writer Pendleton Ward, and Max Temkin of Cards Against Humanity.

Reception
David M. Ewalt comments on the 2010 version: "A horror-themed board game that's different every time you play. Players explore a haunted house until one goes crazy and tries to kill their friends. Randomized, secret scenarios provide surprising story lines and different rules for the killer each game. It's lots of fun, particularly if you're the murderous traitor."  Reviewing the second edition, Michael Harrison of Wired.com said he enjoyed the game but found that some of the rules could be exploited to game-breaking effect.

A board game review in The Wirecutter stated that the game is "too complex for beginners."

In a review of Betrayal at House on the Hill in Black Gate, Andrew Zimmerman Jones said "What Betrayal at House on the Hill taught me was that the storytelling excitement of roleplaying can be captured within a box, with the added benefit of a lot less planning on the part of a gamemaster."

Awards
Betrayal at House on the Hill won a 2004 Gamers' Choice Award for Best Board Game.

Reviews
Pyramid

References

External links
 
 
 

Avalon Hill games
Board games introduced in 2004
Board games with a modular board
Cooperative board games
Horror board games
Mike Selinker games
Origins Award winners
Dungeon crawler board games